is a city in the northwestern end of Nara Prefecture, Japan. It was founded on November 1, 1971. As of April 1, 2017, the city has an estimated population of 120,741, with 49,672 households. It has a population density of 2,300 persons per km², and it has the third largest population in the prefecture. The total area is 53.18 km². The city is famous for chasen. Kansai Science City is partially located in Ikoma, which is also home to the Nara Institute of Science and Technology.

Notable locations
Mount Ikoma
Skyland Ikoma (amusement park on top Mount Ikoma)
Kurondo-ike Pond
Kuragari-toge Pass

Religious institutions
Ikoma Jinja
Hozan-ji
Chikurin-ji
Chokyu-ji
Chofuku-ji
Enpuku-ji
Sekibutsu-Ji

Transportation

Rail
Kintetsu Railway
Nara Line: Ikoma Station - Higashi-Ikoma Station
Ikoma Line: Ikoma Station - Nabata Station - Ichibu Station - Minami-Ikoma Station - Haginodai Station - Higashiyama Station
Keihanna Line: Ikoma Station - Shiraniwadai Station - Gakken Kita-Ikoma Station - Gakken Nara-Tomigaoka Station
Ikoma Cable Line: Toriimae Station (Ikoma Station) - Hōzanji Station - Umeyashiki Station - Kasumigaoka Station - Ikoma-Sanjō Station

Roads
Expressways
Hanshin Expressway Dainihanna Route 
Japan National Route 163
Japan National Route 168
Japan National Route 308
Shigi Ikoma Skyline

Gallery

References

External links

 Ikoma City official website 
 NPO of Ikoma support intellectual disabilities and their families official website 

Cities in Nara Prefecture